"Behind the Sun" is a song by the Red Hot Chili Peppers from their 1987 album, The Uplift Mofo Party Plan although was not released as a single until 1992 when it was used to promote the band's What Hits!? compilation album. The song charted at number 7 on the US Billboard Modern Rock Tracks chart and in New Zealand as well as number 37 on the Australian ARIA Singles Chart.

Background
The band had originally wanted to release the song as a single back in 1987 however the label refused to release it because they felt it was too melodic and didn't represent the band's sound. It would not be released as a single until 1992 to promote the What Hits!? compilation album, a hits package EMI released to cash in on the band's newfound major label mainstream success thanks to their album Blood Sugar Sex Magik and the hit ballad, "Under the Bridge".

Music video
The music video was released on November 9, 1992, and received heavy rotation on MTV. The video features a mixture of animation and footage of the band from their 1989 "Higher Ground" music video. John Frusciante and Chad Smith appear in the video even though they didn't play on the song and were not with the band at the time it was recorded.

Notes
In 1987, the band gave a lip-synched performance of "Behind the Sun" and "Fight Like a Brave" at the United Cerebral Palsy Telethon.
Despite the band's intentions for the song to become a single and years later eventually becoming one, the song has only been performed one time in 1987, with Flea explaining in an interview that the band wasn't pleased with how the song sounded live. However, it has been teased by the band quite a few times over the years in their live performances, with its intro being teased on the band's One Hot Minute tour during "Give It Away". On September 10, 2012, the song was once again teased while the band was performing in Tel Aviv for the first time. It was teased right before "Under the Bridge" was played.
It is also notable in being the only song from the Slovak era to have made it to the charts (although it was released after his death).
Hillel Slovak's brother (James Slovak) named Hillel's biography Behind the Sun.
During March 2012, The Weather Channel began using an instrumental demo version of the song as background music for its Local on the 8s segments.

Track listing
Promo 12" inch single (1987)
 "Behind the Sun" (Album)
 "Special Secret Song Inside" (Album)

Cassette single (1992)
 "Behind the Sun" (Album)
 "Higher Ground" (Pearly 12")

Promo CD single (1992)
 "Behind the Sun" (Edit)
 "Behind the Sun" (Album)

CD single (1992) (Also known as 'The Chili Digi' in Digipack)
 "Behind the Sun" (album)
 "Higher Ground" (Pearly 12")
 "If You Want Me to Stay" (Pink Mustang Mix)
 "Knock Me Down" (Album)

Promo Jukebox 7" single (1992)
 "Behind the Sun" (album)
 "Fire" (album)

Charts

References

Red Hot Chili Peppers songs
1987 songs
1992 singles
EMI Records singles
Capitol Records singles
Songs written by Hillel Slovak
Songs written by Flea (musician)
Songs written by Anthony Kiedis
Songs written by Jack Irons
Song recordings produced by Michael Beinhorn
American psychedelic rock songs